Kororofa (Kwararafa in Hausa) was a multiethnic state and/or confederacy centered along the Benue River valley in what is today central Nigeria. It was southwest of the Bornu Empire and south of the Hausa States. They rose to prominence before 1500, were in conflict with their more powerful neighbours in the 17th century, and reduced to a small tribute state by the 18th century. It is believed that Kwararafa was either a confederacy conquest state, led by the modern Jukun people or perhaps a collective name given by their Muslim foes for a number of pagan peoples to their south.

Regardless, a spiritually important pagan Jukun priest-kingship at Wukari appears to have been the centre of Kwararafa power, but in the 17th century, that may have spread much farther. Leo Africanus records a Bornu raid into Kwararafa territory at the end of the 15th century and the resistance of Kwararafa horsemen. They practiced a bureaucratic state of rule and was headed by the Aku whose powers were greatly limited.

The Kano Chronicles among other Hausa sources record successful invasions of Hausaland by the Kwararafa, specifically against Kano around 1600, again in the middle of the century, and another in 1671. In the 1670s the Kwararafa assaulted Katsina, sacked Zaria and launched an invasion of Bornu. Bornu sources recount Kwararafa striking towards the capital of Ngasargamu and being turned aside in a great battle by Mai Ali bin Umar. Katsina chronicler Dan Marina recounts the Mai Ali killing, wounding and capturing many Kwararafa and sending three captives back to their leader, with their ears severed and hung around their necks.

Regardless of the brutality of the relations, there seems to have been a long period of respect between states.  During the 18th century, communities of each apparently lived in the cities of the other, and a tradition of Muslim emissaries served the Kwararafa.

Hausa communities too were found in the Kwararafa territory. Still, the state apparently was resolutely pagan and remained so past its decline in the 18th century. By the end of that century, Kwararafa paid tribute to Bornu. By the 19th century they were reduced to small towns, resisting, for a period, the Fulani Jihad of the Sokoto Caliphate.

The successor state, the Wukari Federation, was established around 1840 and remains as a Nigerian traditional state. It remains the only tribe that conquered the Hausa and the most powerful tribe in Nigeria in the 17th century.

References

The Times Atlas of World History. (Maplewood: Hammond, 1989) p. 137
The DK Atlas of World History. Map of "African Trade and the Spread of Islam, 500-1500 AD". (Dorling Kindersley Publishing Book, 2000) p. 162

History of Nigeria
Countries in precolonial Africa
Former countries in Africa
15th-century establishments in Nigeria
1840s disestablishments in Nigeria